Samuel Augspurger House is a registered historic building in Woodsdale, Ohio, listed in the National Register on 1984-11-01.

Historic uses 
Single Dwelling

Notes

External links
Ohio Historic Inventory

Houses on the National Register of Historic Places in Ohio
Houses in Butler County, Ohio
National Register of Historic Places in Butler County, Ohio